, formerly published under its full name  until December 2007, is a shōjo manga magazine published semimonthly in Japan by Shogakukan since 1968.

The manga featured in Sho-Comi are later compiled and published in book form (tankōbon) under the Flower Comics imprint.

History

Beginning with the January 2008 issue published in December 2007, the magazine was renamed Sho-Comi.

Serializations

Current
 Seishun Heavy Rotation (2020–present)
 Isekai Maō wa Fujoshi o Zettai Nigasanai (2020–present)

Past

1968–1979
 Wandering Sun (1970-1971)
 Sora ga Suki! (1971–1972)
 The Heart of Thomas (1974–1975)
 Baptism (1974–1976)
 Cyborg 009 (1975–1976)
 Kaze to Ki no Uta (1976–1984)
 Star Red (1978–1979)

1980–1989

 Hiatari Ryōkō! (1980–1981)
 Georgie! (1982–1984)
 Onaji Kurai Ai (1984–1985)
 Purple Eyes in the Dark (1984–1986)
 Boyfriend (1985–1988)
 Momoka Typhoon (1987–1989)
 3 – Three (1989–1992)

1990–1999

 Ao no Fūin (1991–1994)
 Fushigi Yûgi (1991–1996)
 Red River (1995–2002)
 Tokyo Juliet (1996–1999)
 Ceres, Celestial Legend (1996–2000)
 Sensual Phrase (1997–2000)
 Wild Act (1998–2000)
 Appare Jipangu! (1998–2003)
 Binetsu Shōjo (1999–2001)

2000–2009

 Imadoki! (2000–2001)
 Alice 19th (2001–2003)
 Kare First Love (2002–2004)
 Shinju no Kusari (2002)
 Boku wa Imōto ni Koi o Suru (2003–2005)
 Absolute Boyfriend (2003–2005)
 Happy Hustle High (2004–2005)
 Love Celeb (2004–2006)
 Honey × Honey Drops (2004–2006)
 Punch! (2005–2006)
 Boku no Hatsukoi o Kimi ni Sasagu (2005–2008)
 Uwasa no Midori-kun!! (2006–2008)
 Kyō, Koi o Hajimemasu (2007–2014)
 Gaba Kawa (2007)
 Suki Desu Suzuki-kun!! (2008–2012)

2010–2019

 Flower and the Beast (2010–2012)
 Hachimitsu ni Hatsukoi (2012–2015)
 So Cute it Hurts!! (2012–2015)
 Miseinen Dakedo Kodomo Janai (2012–2016)
 True Love (2013–2015)
 Anoko no Toriko (2013–2014)
 4-gatsu no Kimi, Spica (2015–2019)
 Awa-Koi (2016–2018)
 Dō-Kyū-Sei: Zutto Kimi ga Suki Datta (2018–2020)

Reception
In 2007, the Japanese National PTA Conference ranked Sho-Comi the worst manga magazine for young children due to its excessive sexual content. Many concerned parents have advised publishers to be more wary of the availability of these magazines to young readers.

From January to March 2019, Sho-Comi had 70,000 physical copies in circulation, which later dropped to 68,000 from April to June 2019. From July to September 2019, the magazine had 63,000 physical copies in circulation.

See also

 Betsucomi
 ChuChu
 Ciao
 Cheese!

References

External links
  
 Official circulation numbers at JMPA 
 Official publication information at Shogakukan AdPocket 
 Sho-Comis 50th anniversary (interviews and chronology) at Comic Natalie 
 

1968 establishments in Japan
Magazines established in 1968
Magazines published in Tokyo
Monthly manga magazines published in Japan
Semimonthly manga magazines published in Japan
Shogakukan magazines
Shōjo manga magazines
Weekly manga magazines published in Japan